S. nigricauda may refer to:
 Sipia nigricauda, the stub-tailed antbird, a bird species
 Spicara nigricauda, Norman, 1931, the blacktail picarel, a fish species in the genus Spicara and the family Centracanthidae
 Stenaelurillus nigricauda, a jumping spider species in the genus Stenaelurillus

See also
 Nigricauda (disambiguation)